Little River is a  tributary of Casco Bay in Maine, United States.

It flows southwest, passing beneath Newfield Road, Flying Point Road and, at its mouth, Burnett Road in Freeport.

It was built in 2009 and, as of 2016, an average of 300 vehicles cross it daily.

The shores of Little River are believed to have been seasonal fishing settlements historically.

Mouth
Its mouth is located between Wolfe's Neck Center for Agriculture & the Environment and Wolfe's Neck Woods State Park in Freeport.

See also
List of rivers of Maine

References
Specific

General

Maine Streamflow Data from the USGS
Maine Watershed Data From Environmental Protection Agency

Rivers of Cumberland County, Maine
Freeport, Maine
Brunswick, Maine